Mark Stewart (born 25 August 1995) is a Scottish road and track cyclist, who currently rides for UCI ProTeam . Representing Great Britain and Scotland at international competitions, Stewart won the bronze medal at the 2016 UEC European Track Championships in the team pursuit.

Career
He was announced as part of the  team's squad for the 2017 season.

Following the travel restrictions brought about by the COVID-19 pandemic in 2020, Stewart based himself in New Zealand, having been in the country to visit his partner Emma Cumming, following the 2020 UCI Track Cycling World Championships held in Germany. Due to this, Stewart competed in both the New Zealand National Track Championships in December 2020, and the New Zealand National Road Championships in February 2021. At the Track Championships, Stewart won a gold medal in the omnium, and a silver medal with Adrian Hegyvary in the madison; he also won a silver medal in the road race at the Road Championships, finishing behind George Bennett.

Stewart's 2022 season, with his new team , started with the New Zealand Cycle Classic where the team won the first stage a Team time trial by 22 seconds. Teammate Regan Gough held yellow going into Stage 2 where a group of 13 riders got an advantage of 15 minutes on the peloton Stewart was part of this group. By finishing second on the stage he moved in to the lead of the General classification. He managed to hold the lead all the way to the end even taking a greater lead overall by winning the uphill finish in stage 4. Stewart won the tour overall to win his first Stage race. In April 2022, Stewart won the British National Madison Championships with William Perrett.

Major results

Track

2014–2015
 1st  Points race, National Championships
 3rd Team pursuit, UCI World Cup, Cali
2015–2016
 UCI World Cup
1st Scratch, Cambridge
3rd Madison (with Germain Burton), Cambridge
 National Championships
1st  Team pursuit
1st  Scratch
2016–2017
 UCI World Cup
1st Team pursuit, Glasgow
3rd Madison (with Oli Wood), Apeldoorn
 1st Points race, Fiorenzuola d'Arda
 3rd  Team pursuit, UEC European Championships
2017–2018
 UEC European Under–23 Championships
1st  Individual pursuit
1st  Omnium
 UCI World Cup
2nd Points race, Milton
3rd Madison, Milton
 3rd  Points race, UCI World Championships
2018–2019
 1st  Points race, Commonwealth Games
 UCI World Cup
2nd Points race, Saint-Quentin-en-Yvelines
2nd Team pursuit, Saint-Quentin-en-Yvelines
2nd Madison, Milton
2nd Madison, Berlin
2nd Omnium, Milton
3rd Team pursuit, Milton
 2nd Scratch, National Championships
2019–2020
 UCI World Cup
1st Overall Points race
1st Points race, Minsk
2nd Omnium, Glasgow
3rd Madison, Hong Kong
2020–2021
 1st Omnium, New Zealand National Championships
2021–2022
 1st  Madison (with William Perrett), National Championships
2022–2023
 3rd Overall Endurance, UCI Champions League
1st Scratch, Palma
1st Scratch, London II
3rd Elimination, Palma

Road

2017
 9th Grand Prix Criquielion
2021
 2nd Road race, New Zealand National Championships
2022
 1st  Overall New Zealand Cycle Classic
1st  Mountains classification
1st Stages 1 (TTT) & 4
 1st  Overall Tour of Romania
 3rd Overall International Tour of Hellas
2023
 2nd Per sempre Alfredo

References

External links

1995 births
Living people
British male cyclists
Scottish male cyclists
Scottish track cyclists
Place of birth missing (living people)
Cyclists at the 2014 Commonwealth Games
Commonwealth Games medallists in cycling
Commonwealth Games gold medallists for Scotland
Sportspeople from Dundee
Medallists at the 2018 Commonwealth Games